Sex Crimes and the Vatican (2006) is a documentary film (39 min) presented by the BBC program Panorama. It aired on 1 October 2006.

Allegations
Sex Crimes and the Vatican was filmed for the BBC's Panorama documentary series. It was directed by Sarah Macdonald, filmed by David Niblock and presented by Colm O'Gorman. The film charged that the Vatican used a secret document, Crimen sollicitationis, to silence allegations of sexual abuse by priests and that Crimen sollicitationis was enforced for 20 years by Joseph Cardinal Ratzinger before he became the Pope.

Crimen sollicitationis, subtitled "On the Manner of Proceeding in Cases of the Crime of Solicitation", is based on an earlier instruction of 1922 and was primarily concerned with dealing with the offense of sexual solicitation in Confession. Seventy of the seventy-four paragraphs dealt with establishing internal procedures for handling such cases in the curial court. The procedures having been established, they were then extended to included cases regarding homosexual conduct, any obscene act with preadolescent children, or animals, regardless if any of the prescribed activity had to do with the sacrament of penance.

Many Catholic Bishops, priests and laity expressed anger at what they perceived as a clear bias against the church. They state that the program made no effort to highlight the efforts made by the church in recent years to combat sex abuse, particularly the efforts taken by the English and Welsh Catholic Church under the leaderships of both Cormac Cardinal Murphy-O'Connor and Vincent Cardinal Nichols, Archbishop of Westminster.  These two cardinals  are involved in abuser cover-up cases.

See also

 Roman Catholic sex abuse cases
 Roman Catholic priests accused of sex offenses
 Pontifical Secret
 Deliver Us from Evil (2006), a documentary about a sex abuse case in Northern California
 Twist of Faith (2005), an HBO documentary film about abuse in the Catholic Church
 Mea Maxima Culpa: Silence in the House of God (2012), another HBO documentary

References

External links
 
Most Controversial Highlights in the 1962 Ottaviani Directive (English)
 Avvenire on-line special - L’"inchiesta" Bbc su preti e pedofilia. Some articles trying to rebut alleged mistakes and bias inside the documentary.

2006 television films
2006 films
British television documentaries
Curial response to Catholic Church sexual abuse scandals
Media coverage of Catholic Church sexual abuse scandals
Documentary films about Catholicism
Panorama (British TV programme)
2000s British films